Jeannine Guindon  (3 September 1919, in Montreal – 15 May 2002) was a professor of psychology in Quebec, Canada.

Biography

Jeannine Guindon completed Bachelor of Arts degree and a diploma in pedagogy from the University of Ottawa in 1939, then taught in Cornwall and Mountain, Ontario.  She received a Master of Arts degree in psychology from the Université de Montréal in 1945. Guidon helped found the Montreal Counselling and Rehabilitation Centre and was its director from 1947 to 1977. She also founded the Quebec Psycho-Education Centre which she directed from 1953 to 1969 while teaching psychology at the Université de Montréal.

After obtaining her doctorate in psychology in 1969 from the Université de Montréal, Jeannine Guidon and  presided over the creation of the university's School of Psychoeducation in 1971. She was its director from 1972 to 1976. Guindon, Gendreau, and Euchariste Paulhus were the three main founders of psychoeducation, a discipline serving young people in difficulty.  Guindon particularly chose to train caregivers for people who have intellectual disabilities or disabilities, children with emotional problems, delinquent persons, or those who were socially maladjusted.

In 1976, Guindon co-founded the Mariebourg Center and the Montreal Training and Rehabilitation Institute, which she directed until 1984. Guindon continued to work as a professor of psychology at the Université de Montréal until 1984 and was a member of the university's board of directors from 1977 to 1985. In 1992, the training institute became the Institut de formation humaine intégrale de Montréal ( and received people from around the world.

After her death in 2002, she was entombed at the Notre Dame des Neiges Cemetery in Montreal.

Major publications
Le processus de rééducation du jeune délinquant par l’actualisation du moi
Les étapes de rééducation des jeunes délinquants – et des autres
Vers l’autonomie psychique de la naissance à la mort, 1995, Fleurus
Prendre sa vie en main, l’enjeu de la vingtaine with Julien Alain

Honours
Professor emeritus, Université de Montréal
Honorary Doctorate in Education, Université de Sherbrooke
Member of the Order of Canada, 1974
Chevaliere of the National Order of Quebec, 1990
Member of the Great Montrealers, 1993
Pro Ecclesia and Pontifice Paul VI decoration from the Diocese of Montreal
The Queen's Golden Jubilee Medal, 2002
Commander of the Ordre de Montreal, 2016 (posthumous)

References

1919 births
2002 deaths
French Quebecers
People from Montreal
Université de Montréal alumni
Academic staff of the Université de Montréal
Knights of the National Order of Quebec
Members of the Order of Canada
Burials at Notre Dame des Neiges Cemetery